George Harrison (1943–2001) was an English musician who gained international fame as the lead guitarist of the Beatles. With his songwriting contributions limited by the dominance of John Lennon and Paul McCartney, Harrison was the first member of the Beatles to release a solo album. Wonderwall Music (1968), a mostly instrumental soundtrack album combining Western and Indian sounds, was followed by Electronic Sound (1969), an experimental album containing two lengthy pieces performed on Moog synthesizer. Following the Beatles' break-up in 1970, Harrison released the triple album All Things Must Pass. Co-produced by Phil Spector, it included the hit singles "My Sweet Lord" and "What Is Life". The album featured musical contributions from Eric Clapton and Ringo Starr, both of whom collaborated regularly with Harrison throughout his solo career, and two signature elements of Harrison's work: his slide guitar playing and spiritually themed songwriting.

While organising the Concert for Bangladesh in 1971, Harrison recorded the charity single "Bangla Desh". The Concert for Bangladesh live album included three of Harrison's best-known Beatles songs: "While My Guitar Gently Weeps", "Here Comes the Sun" and "Something". Living in the Material World (1973) featured a pared-down sound and increasingly devout lyrics. It included the single "Give Me Love (Give Me Peace on Earth)" and a title track in which contrasting sections of Indian music and Western rock mirrored Harrison's struggle to attain his spiritual goals. Dark Horse (1974) included songs inspired by the end of his marriage to Pattie Boyd and, particularly in the title track, vocal performances marred by Harrison contracting laryngitis – a result of overexertion as he prepared to launch his Dark Horse record label. Extra Texture (Read All About It) (1975) contained several songs in a downbeat soul style, reflecting his despondency following the mixed reception afforded his 1974 North American tour with Ravi Shankar. Largely recorded in Los Angeles, the album included "This Guitar (Can't Keep from Crying)", a sequel to "While My Guitar Gently Weeps".

Thirty Three & 1/3 (1976) furthered the American soul influence and, with its singles "This Song" and "Crackerbox Palace", was a more buoyant collection than its predecessors. Marked also by a more subtle approach to religious pronouncements, the album typified Harrison's move towards love songs seemingly addressed to his deity as much as to a romantic partner. Co-produced by Russ Titelman, George Harrison (1979) reflected Harrison's contentment after a period spent travelling. It included the hit single "Blow Away", songs celebrating the tranquil surroundings he had discovered on Hawaii, and a tribute to Formula One racing drivers, "Faster". Somewhere in England was released in 1981 and featured "All Those Years Ago", a tribute to Lennon following his murder in December 1980. Gone Troppo (1982) included the single "Wake Up My Love" and "Circles", a song that, like "Not Guilty" from George Harrison, had originally been considered for the Beatles' White Album in 1968.

After a four-year hiatus, Harrison returned with Cloud Nine (1987), co-produced by Jeff Lynne. It included a cover version of Rudy Clark's "Got My Mind Set on You" and the Beatles tribute "When We Was Fab". Harrison then formed the Traveling Wilburys with Lynne, Dylan, Roy Orbison and Tom Petty. He issued the 1989 compilation Best of Dark Horse, which included "Cheer Down", co-written with Petty. Harrison's 1992 album Live in Japan, recorded on tour with Clapton, included renditions of "Taxman", "If I Needed Someone" and several other Harrison compositions from the Beatles' catalogue. Harrison then reunited with Starr and McCartney for the Beatles Anthology multimedia project and collaborated extensively with Shankar, but he issued no further recordings under his own name before his death in November 2001. His final album, Brainwashed (2002), included the singles "Any Road" and "Stuck Inside a Cloud", and the slide-guitar instrumental "Marwa Blues".

Songs

Notes

References

Bibliography

 
 
 
 
 
 
 
 
 
 
 
 
 
 
 
 
 

HarrisonGeorge